Eriyanto (born 12 March 1996, in Sukabumi) is an Indonesian professional footballer who plays as a full-back for Persib Bandung.

Club career

Early career
He is a young Indonesian footballer who joined in The All Star Team Milan Junior Camp who coached by Yeyen Tumena. They made history by winning the Milan Junior Camp Day Tournament, in San Siro, Milan, Italy. On October 17, 2010. Eriyanto was selected as the best captain.

PSIR Rembang
PSIR Rembang is his first professional club, where he played as a right back.

Madura United
In January 2017, Eriyanto signed a contract with Madura United to commence ahead of the 2017 Liga 1. He made his league debut on 16 April 2017 in a match against Bali United at the Gelora Ratu Pamelingan Stadium, Pamekasan.

PSPS Riau
In 2018 Eriyanto signed with PSPS Riau for the 2018 Liga 2. He made 29 league appearances for PSPS, before being released on a free transfer during the mid-season transfer window.

Persiraja Banda Aceh
After being released by PSPS, Persiraja Banda Aceh immediately signed Eriyanto on a free transfer during the mid-season transfer window. He made his league debut on 29 February 2020 by starting in a 0–0 draw against Bhayangkara.

Persis Solo
On 1 May 2021, Eriyanto officially joined Persis Solo from Persiraja Banda Aceh. Eriyanto made his first 2021–22 Liga 2 debut on 26 September 2021, coming on as a substitute in a 2–0 win against PSG Pati at the Manahan Stadium, Surakarta.

Persiraja Banda Aceh (loan)
He was signed for Persiraja Banda Aceh to play in Liga 1 in the 2021 season, on loan from Persis Solo. Eriyanto made his league debut on 30 January 2022 in a match against Persija Jakarta at the Ngurah Rai Stadium, Denpasar.

Honours

Club
Persiraja Banda Aceh
 Liga 2 third place (play-offs): 2019
Persis Solo
 Liga 2: 2021

References

External links
Eriyanto at Soccerway

1996 births
Living people
Indonesian footballers
Sportspeople from West Java
People from Sukabumi
Liga 1 (Indonesia) players
Liga 2 (Indonesia) players
PSIR Rembang players
Madura United F.C. players
PSPS Pekanbaru players
PSPS Riau players
Persis Solo players
Persiraja Banda Aceh players
Persib Bandung players
Indonesia youth international footballers
Association football defenders